"You're Out of My Life" is a song recorded by Swedish singer Darin and was Darin's entry in Melodifestivalen 2010. The song was first performed in Deltävling 3 (Heat 3) of Melodifestivalen in Göteborg on 20 February 2010 where Darin reached second place and progressed to the final on March 13 in Stockholm. The single was released on 28 February 2010. This is Darin's first physical single release since his departure from Sony Music.

History
On 3 November 2009, it was announced that Darin would be participating in the Melodifestivalen 2010, the Swedish show thatg determines the country's entry to the Eurovision Song Contest 2010 in Oslo, Norway. Darin entered with the mid-tempo ballad "You're Out of My Life" written by Tony Nilsson and Henrik Janson who wrote Velvet's The Queen for the 2009 edition. Darin performed 7th in Deltävling 3 (Heat 3) of Melodifestivalen.

There was worry that Darin's song "You're Out of My Life" would be disqualified after it was incorrectly made available to purchase during the week after the semi-final. A total of 54 downloads of the full studio version were made, making a #95 entry into the Swedish singles chart. However, SVT confirmed that Darin would not be disqualified as the mistake was made by the distributor and not by Darin or his management. The song was immediately taken off the music store, and was officially released along with the rest of the Melodifestivalen songs.

The song progressed to the second round of voting, after which Darin was voted through to the final, coming second in the heat after girl group Timoteij with their song "Kom". Darin participated in the Melodifestivalen final on 13 March 2010, at Globe Arena in Stockholm, where he finished in fourth place with a total of 117 points, receiving two sets of 12 points from the Greek and Russian juries.

Track listing
Digital Download:
 You're Out of My Life 03:18 (Henrik Janson, Tony Nilsson)

CD Single:
 You're Out of My Life 3:18 (Henrik Janson, Tony Nilsson)
 Viva La Vida 4:33 (Guy Berryman, Jonny Buckland, Will Champion, Chris Martin)

Charts
The single debuted and peaked at number 3 on the Swedish Singles Chart, charting behind Anna Bergendahl's and Eric Saade's Melodifestivalen 2010 singles.

Weekly charts

Year-end charts

Certifications

Release history

References

2010 singles
Darin (singer) songs
Swedish pop songs
Melodifestivalen songs of 2010
Songs written by Tony Nilsson
Universal Music Group singles
English-language Swedish songs
2009 songs
Songs written by Henrik Janson